

Friedrich Hiller von Gaertringen (3 August 1864 – 25 October 1947) was a German archeologist and philologist, a specialist in Greek epigraphy.

Life
Hiller von Gaertringen was the son of the Prussian army officer Rudolf Hiller von Gaertringen (1837–1877) and Helene Luise Kramsta (1842–1872). He studied ancient history, first with Alfred von Gutschmid at Tübingen, then with Theodor Mommsen in Berlin. After receiving his Ph.D. in 1886 he continued at Göttingen with Ulrich von Wilamowitz-Moellendorff.

He participated in the excavation at Magnesia on the Maeander under the leadership of Carl Humann in 1890 and became a corresponding member of the German Archaeological Institute in 1892. In 1904 he became a member of the Prussian Academy of Sciences.

He collaborated with Mommsen on Inscriptiones Graecae, the corpus of Greek inscriptions from 1893 onwards. In total, he produced nine volumes for the series between 1895 and 1939, mostly dealing with inscriptions from the Aegean islands. Most of these volumes have not been superseded. He also produced a new edition of the Sylloge inscriptionum Graecarum (SIG) begun by Wilhelm Dittenberger and the first edition of the inscriptions of Priene. From 1917 to 1933 he was honorary professor of Greek epigraphy at the University of Berlin.

In 1905 Hiller von Gaertringen married Dorothea von Wilamowitz-Moellendorff (1879-1972), oldest daughter of his former teacher and granddaughter of his former teacher Theodor Mommsen. His personal library and notes were destroyed by a bombing raid in 1943.

Select Bibliography
 Inscriptiones Graecae
 I2 Inscriptiones Atticae Euclidis anno anteriores. (Inscriptions of Attica, from before the year of Euclid [403/2 BC]) 1924. 
 IV2, 1. Inscriptiones Argolidis: Inscriptiones Epidauri (Inscriptions of the Argolid: Inscriptions of Epidaurus). 1929.
 V, 2. Inscriptiones Arcadiae (Inscriptions of Arcadia). 1913.
 XI, 3. Inscriptiones Deli. Tabulae (Inscriptions of Delos. Tables). 1927.
 XII, 2. Inscriptiones Rhodi, Chalces, Carpathi cum Saro, Casi (Inscriptions of Rhodes, Chalcis, Carpathus with Saros, and Kasos). 1895.
 XII, 3. Inscriptiones Symes, Teutlussae, Teli, Nisyri, Astypalaeae, Anaphes, Therae et Therasiae, Pholegandri, Meli, Cimoli (Inscriptions of Syme, Telos, Nisyros, Astypalaea, Anafi, Thera and Therasia, Pholegandros, Melos, Kimolos) 1898. Supplementum (Supplement). 1904.
 XII, 5. Inscriptiones Cycladum (Inscriptions of the Cyclades). 1903, 1909.
 XII, Inscriptiones insularum maris Aegaei praeter Delum: Supplementum. (Inscriptions of the Aegean islands aside from Delos: Supplement) 1939.
 Inschriften von Priene (Inscriptions of Priene) Reimer, Berlin 1906; reissued by Walter de Gruyter 1968.
 Sylloge inscriptionum Graecarum. 3rd edition. 4 volumes. Hirzel, Leipzig 1915–1924.
 Thera. Untersuchungen, Vermessungen, Ausgrabungen in den Jahren 1895–1898 (Thera: Investigations, Surveys, and Excavations in the years 1895–1898). 5 volumes. Reimer, Berlin 1898–1903.

References

External links
 Friedrich Hiller von Gaertringen in Wikitext  - sources and full-text
 Entry in Neue Deutsche Biographie
 

1864 births
1947 deaths
German philologists
Epigraphers
Scientists from Berlin
University of Tübingen alumni
Academic staff of the Humboldt University of Berlin
Classical archaeologists